Melissa Ann Witek (born April 9, 1981) is an American actress, model, television personality, and beauty queen who competed in the Miss USA pageant and appeared on the reality television show Treasure Hunters.

Biography
Witek was born in Rockledge, Florida. She later moved to Cocoa Beach, Florida, which presented her with the key to the city in August 2004.  A sister of Delta Delta Delta sorority, she graduated from the University of Florida with a degree in Public Relations in 2003, the third consecutive University of Florida alumna to win the Miss Florida USA crown. From 2003 to 2005, Witek was CEO and President of her own builders' supply company, Ampex Granite, which she discussed during her live interview for the Miss USA 2005 pageant.

Pageantry
Witek's first pageant title was Miss Florida Gator which she won in February 2002.  With this title, she competed at Miss Florida 2002 (in the Miss America system), but did not place.  Her first Miss USA system title was Miss Florida Panhandle USA, which she won in March 2004.  In May of that year, she competed against forty-seven other contestants in the Miss Florida USA pageant held in Hollywood, Florida and broadcast live throughout the state.  Witek won the crown and numerous other prizes, including cash, a wardrobe and use of an apartment in Hollywood during her reign.

On April 11, 2005, Witek represented Florida in the Miss USA 2005 pageant broadcast live from Baltimore, Maryland on NBC.  She placed fourth runner-up to Chelsea Cooley of North Carolina, her state's highest placement since 1987.

Reality television
Months before her state pageant win, Witek had made the semi-finals of reality television show The Bachelor but was cut because of the possibility of her knowing the Bachelor, former University of Florida football star Jesse Palmer. In April 2006 it was announced that Witek was among the cast of the new NBC reality television series Treasure Hunters that aired June 18, 2006.  She teamed up with fellow Miss USA 2005 delegates Kristen Johnson of Kentucky and Kaitlyn Christopher of Indiana for the competition, which was taped during September and October 2005.  Their group, Team Miss USA, came in as fourth runner-up on the show.

Personal life
As of 2020 She lives in Orlando, FL. She is a Registered Republican.

Notes

References
Granite's Glamour Girl, Pageantry magazine (accessed 3 May 2006)
City of Hollywood Staff Summary Request: Presentation of Melissa Witek, Miss Florida USA 2005 (accessed 3 May 2006)
Miss Florida balances crown with business, Florida Today, 29 August 2004 (accessed 3 May 2006)
Tale of Two Miss Floridas, Pageantry magazine

External links
MelissaWitek.com
USA Today
 

University of Florida alumni
Living people
1981 births
Miss USA 2005 delegates
People from Cocoa Beach, Florida
People from Rockledge, Florida
Florida Republicans
Participants in American reality television series